"Happy Release" is an episode of the British sitcom Porridge, made for the BBC. It first aired on 21 November 1975, and is the fifth episode of the second series. In this episode, Fletcher concocts a scheme to help another prisoner get revenge on someone for cheating them of their possessions.

Synopsis
Due to an accident caused by falling off a ladder, Fletcher is put in the prison infirmary with a broken ankle, much to the annoyance of prison officer Mackay, who had him down for drainage detail. Alongside Fletcher, he is kept company in the infirmary by the elderly Blanco, and the unpleasant Norris, both of whom are not speaking to each other. Whilst they are on their own, Blanco reveals to Fletcher that he suspects Norris of cheating in a card game they had, which resulted in him losing his possessions as a result.

That night, Blanco informs Fletcher that if he dies before he is released from prison, he would bequeath to him a treasure map to the loot he stole. Norris overhears this, and attempts to search Fletcher's bed for it. However, this attracts the attention of prison officer Barrowclough, who scolds Norris for causing trouble and jeopardising his upcoming parole. Although he attempts to find out what he was looking for, Barrowclough decides against this on the belief it was a diversion for prisoners to escape. The next morning, Norris makes a proposition to Fletcher and Blanco for the map, offering to look after it until they are released. Fletcher agrees, only if he can find the map.

After leaving the infirmary, Norris visits Godber, since he has been visiting with meals while on kitchen duty. Godber refuses to betray Fletcher when asked about taking anything from him with a piece of paper in it, but eventually hands over the map after Norris offers several valuable items for it. When Godber visits the infirmary on his next round, Fletcher takes delight that Norris fell for a dirty trick - the map was a fake, and the items he used to get it were those taken from Blanco. The group soon later listen to Blanco's radio, and overhear news that Norris had been arrested for digging up a football pitch in Leeds, much to their amusement.

Episode cast

References

Porridge (1974 TV series) episodes
1975 British television episodes